is a passenger railway station in the town of Shimonita, Gunma, Japan, operated by the private railway operator Jōshin Dentetsu.

Lines

Station layout
The station consists of a single bay platform serving four tracks, connected to the station building by a level crossing.

Adjacent stations

History
Shimonita Station opened on 8 September 1897.

Surrounding area
 Shimonita Town Hall
Shimonita Post Office

See also
 List of railway stations in Japan

External links

 Jōshin Dentetsu 
 Burari-Gunma 

Railway stations in Gunma Prefecture
Railway stations in Japan opened in 1897
Shimonita, Gunma